The 2018–19 Mount St. Mary's Mountaineers men's basketball team represented Mount St. Mary's University during the 2018–19 NCAA Division I men's basketball season. The Mountaineers were led by first-year head coach Dan Engelstad, and played their home games at Knott Arena in Emmitsburg, Maryland as members of the Northeast Conference. They finished the season 9–22 overall, 6–12 in NEC play to finish in ninth place. They failed to qualify for the NEC tournament.

Previous season
The Mountaineers finished the 2017–18 season, 18–14, 12–6 in NEC play to finish in a tie for second place. As the No. 2 seed in the NEC tournament, they were upset in the quarterfinals by Robert Morris.

On May 2, 2018, former head coach Jamion Christian left the team to take the head coaching job at Siena. One week later, the school hired former Mountaineer assistant coach Dan Engelstad from Division III Southern Vermont.

Roster

Schedule and results

|-
!colspan=12 style=| Exhibition

|-
!colspan=12 style=| Non-Conference Regular season

|-
!colspan=12 style=| NEC regular season

Source

References

Mount St. Mary's Mountaineers men's basketball seasons
Mount St. Mary's Mountaineers
Mount St. Mary's Mountaineers men's basketball team
Mount St. Mary's Mountaineers men's basketball team